Pierre Cohen (born 20 March 1950) is a member of the National Assembly of France.  He represents the Haute-Garonne department,  and is a member of the Socialist, Radical, Citizen and Miscellaneous Left group.

Early life
Cohen was born in Bizerte, a town in North Tunisia to a Tunisian Jewish father and French Catholic mother.

Mayor of Toulouse
In the 2008 French municipal elections, he became mayor of Toulouse when he narrowly defeated UMP incumbent Jean-Luc Moudenc. However, at the next elections in 2014, Moudenc defeated Cohen in a rematch to re-take the job.

See also

References

1950 births
Living people
People from Bizerte
French people of Tunisian-Jewish descent
Socialist Party (France) politicians
Deputies of the 11th National Assembly of the French Fifth Republic
Deputies of the 12th National Assembly of the French Fifth Republic
Deputies of the 13th National Assembly of the French Fifth Republic
Mayors of Toulouse
Paul Sabatier University alumni
Politicians from Occitania (administrative region)